The 1974–75 NHL season was the 58th season of the National Hockey League. Two new teams, the Washington Capitals and Kansas City Scouts were added, increasing the number of teams to 18. To accommodate the new teams, the NHL re-organized its divisional structure and playoff format. The regular season was expanded to 80 games per team (which would be the case until 1992–93). The Philadelphia Flyers won the Stanley Cup for the second consecutive year.

League business
With the addition of two new teams, the Washington Capitals and Kansas City Scouts, the NHL bumped up the number of games from 78 to 80 and split the previously two-division league into two conferences with four divisions. Because the new conferences and divisions had little to do with North American geography, geographical references were also removed until 1993. The East Division became the Prince of Wales Conference and consisted of the Adams Division and Norris Division. The West Division became the Clarence Campbell Conference and consisted of the Patrick Division and Smythe Division. The Capitals had the worst season ever recorded in the history of major professional hockey, and the third worst in the postwar era the following season, while the Scouts the following season will have the fifth worst record of the postwar era.

The Clarence S. Campbell Bowl and Prince of Wales Trophy (previously awarded to the first-place finishers of the West Division and East Division respectively) are now awarded to the first-place finishers of the Campbell Conference and the Wales Conference respectively.

Cancelled relocation
In early 1975, newspapers reported that the California Golden Seals and Pittsburgh Penguins were to be relocated to Denver and Seattle respectively, in an arrangement that would have seen the two teams sold to groups in those cities that had already been awarded "conditional" franchises for the 1976–77 season. After staunchly rejecting previous franchise relocation attempts, league president Clarence Campbell saw this as a method by which the NHL might extricate itself from two problem markets, while honoring the expansion commitments it had made. The Penguins ended up staying in Pittsburgh (and ultimately, over time, made Pittsburgh one of the NHL's stronger markets), while the Golden Seals moved to Cleveland in 1976 to become the Cleveland Barons before merging with the Minnesota North Stars in 1978. The Scouts gave up on Kansas City after two seasons and moved to Denver to become the Colorado Rockies in 1976 before moving east to East Rutherford, New Jersey in 1982 and becoming the New Jersey Devils; Denver returned to the NHL in 1995 when the Quebec Nordiques moved there and became the Colorado Avalanche, where they remain to this day. Seattle was later awarded an expansion team, the Seattle Kraken, in 2018 that began play in 2021.

Regular season
For the first time ever in the National Hockey League, there was a three-way tie for first place overall. The respective divisional leaders of the Norris (Montreal Canadiens), Patrick (Philadelphia Flyers), and Adams (Buffalo Sabres) all had 113 points. By virtue of having the most wins, the Flyers were accorded the league's best record and held home-ice advantage in the playoffs, where they eventually met the Sabres in the Stanley Cup Finals.

The Vancouver Canucks, which had been playing in the original East Division since they debuted in the league, were moved over to the Campbell Conference and led the way in the Smythe Division with a meager 86 points.

Bobby Orr won the scoring title for the second time, the only defenceman in the history of the NHL to accomplish this feat.

The surprise team of the year were the Los Angeles Kings. When the new divisional lineup was announced, many hockey experts felt the Canadiens were in the weakest division and joked they would clinch first place by Christmas. But the Kings, with their disciplined defensive style, and excellent goaltending tandem of Rogie Vachon and Gary Edwards, battled Montreal all year for first place. The Kings opened their season by beating the defending champion Philadelphia Flyers in Philadelphia and tying the Canadiens in Montreal. The Kings lost only twice in their first 26 games, and on Christmas, Montreal had only a two-point lead in the standings. When L.A. won in Montreal in mid-January, they were back in first place. The teams continued to battle, with the Canadiens finally clinching first place with three games to play.

Final standings
Note: GP = Games played, W = Wins, L = Losses, T = Ties, Pts = Points, GF = Goals for, GA = Goals against

Note: Teams that qualified for the playoffs are highlighted in bold

Prince of Wales Conference

Clarence Campbell Conference

Playoffs

With the new conference and division structure, the 1975 playoffs used a new format. The playoffs were expanded from eight to twelve teams with the top three teams in each division qualifying for the playoffs. The first place teams in each division earned a first round bye, while the second and third place teams were seeded 1–8 based on their regular season record and played a best-of-three series. The four division winners then joined the four preliminary series winners in the quarterfinals, and they were again re-seeded 1–8 based on regular season record. This re-seeding took place again in the semifinals, with the teams seeded 1–4. Proponents of this re-seeding state that it makes the regular season more important by rewarding teams with better records with potentially easier matchups. In addition, it avoids the potential issue of two lower seeded teams (who may have pulled early round upsets) playing each other in the next round while two higher seeded teams are playing each other (as is possible in a "bracketed" playoff format like in the NBA). The biggest beneficiary of this format was the Vancouver Canucks, who were ninth overall in the regular season but received a first-round bye for winning the relatively weak Smythe Division. Unfortunately for Vancouver, the fact that the Quarterfinals was re-seeded regardless to their first place divisional finish meant they had to face another division champion in the second round, the Norris-winning Montreal Canadiens, who defeated Vancouver 4–1. The team that suffered the most from the new format, the Los Angeles Kings, had the fourth best overall record but had to play in the risky mini series where they were upset by the twelfth-seeded Toronto Maple Leafs 2–1.

Playoff seeds

The twelve teams that qualified for the playoffs are ranked 1–12 based on regular season points.

Note: Only teams that qualified for the playoffs are listed here.

 Philadelphia Flyers, Patrick Division champions, Clarence Campbell Conference regular season champions – 113 points (51 wins)
 Buffalo Sabres, Adams Division champions, Prince of Wales Conference regular season champions – 113 points (49 wins)
 Montreal Canadiens, Norris Division champions – 113 points (47 wins)
 Los Angeles Kings – 105 points
 Boston Bruins – 94 points
 Pittsburgh Penguins – 89 points
 New York Rangers – 88 points (37 wins)
 New York Islanders – 88 points (33 wins)
 Vancouver Canucks, Smythe Division champions – 86 points
 St. Louis Blues – 84 points
 Chicago Black Hawks – 82 points
 Toronto Maple Leafs – 78 points

Playoff bracket

 Division winners earned a bye to the Quarterfinals
 Teams were re-seeded based on regular season record after the Preliminary and Quarterfinal rounds

Preliminary round

(1) Los Angeles Kings vs. (8) Toronto Maple Leafs

The Los Angeles Kings entered the preliminary round as the top seed (and fourth seed overall) earning 105 points during the regular season. The Toronto Maple Leafs earned 78 points during the regular season and entered the preliminary round as the eighth seed (and twelfth seed overall). This was the first playoff series between these two teams. Los Angeles won this year's season series earning 9 of 10 points during the regular season.

(2) Boston Bruins vs. (7) Chicago Black Hawks

The Boston Bruins entered the preliminary round as the second seed (and fifth seed overall) earning 94 points during the regular season. The Chicago Black Hawks earned 82 points during the regular season and entered the preliminary round as the seventh seed (and eleventh seed overall). This was the fifth playoff series between these two teams, with Boston winning all four previous meetings. Thus was a rematch of last year's Stanley Cup Semifinals where Boston won in six games. The teams split this year's regular season series.

(3) Pittsburgh Penguins vs. (6) St. Louis Blues

The Pittsburgh Penguins entered the preliminary round as the third seed (and sixth seed overall) earning 89 points during the regular season. The St. Louis Blues earned 84 points during the regular season and entered the preliminary round as the sixth seed (and tenth seed overall). This was the second playoff series between these two teams, with St. Louis winning the only previous meeting in six games in the 1970 Stanley Cup Semifinals. The teams split this year's regular season series.

(4) New York Rangers vs. (5) New York Islanders

The New York Rangers entered the preliminary round as the fourth seed (and seventh seed overall) earning 88 points during the regular season, winning the tie-breaker with the New York Islanders in wins (37 to 33). The New York Islanders earned 88 points during the regular season and entered the preliminary round as the fifth seed (and eighth seed overall), losing the tie-breaker with the New York Rangers in wins (37 to 33). This was the first playoff series between these two teams. The Rangers won this year's season series earning 7 of 12 points during the regular season.

Quarterfinals

(1) Philadelphia Flyers vs. (8) Toronto Maple Leafs

The Philadelphia Flyers entered the playoffs as the defending Stanley Cup champions, the Patrick Division champions, the Clarence Campbell Conference regular season champions, and the first seed overall earning 113 points during the regular season, winning the tie-breaker over both Buffalo and Montreal in total wins. The Toronto Maple Leafs were seeded eighth in the Quarterfinals as the lowest remaining seed in the playoffs and qualified for the Quarterfinals by defeating the Los Angeles Kings in the preliminary round. This was the first playoff series between these two teams. Philadelphia won this year's season series earning 7 of 8 points during the regular season.

(2) Buffalo Sabres vs. (7) Chicago Black Hawks

The Buffalo Sabres entered the playoffs as the Adams Division champions, the Prince of Wales Conference regular season champions, and the second seed overall earning 113 points during the regular season, losing the most wins tie-breaker to Philadelphia while winning the same tie-breaker over Montreal. The Chicago Black Hawks were seeded seventh in the Quarterfinals as the second lowest remaining seed in the playoffs and qualified for the Quarterfinals by defeating the Boston Bruins in the preliminary round. This was the first playoff series between these two teams. Buffalo won three of the four games in this year's regular season series.

(3) Montreal Canadiens vs. (6) Vancouver Canucks

The Montreal Canadiens entered the playoffs as the Norris Division champions, and the third seed overall earning 113 points during the regular season, losing the tie-breaker to both Philadelphia and Buffalo in total wins. The Vancouver Canucks earned 86 points during the regular season and entered the playoffs as the Smythe Division champions. The Canucks were seeded sixth in the Quarterfinals as the third lowest remaining seed in the playoffs and qualified for the Quarterfinals by winning their division. This was the first  playoff series between these two teams. Montreal swept all four games in this year's regular season series. This series also marked the first appearance of a team representing Vancouver in the Stanley Cup playoffs in 51 years. The most recent team to represent Vancouver prior to this was the Vancouver Maroons who lost to the Montreal Canadiens in the 1924 Stanley Cup Semifinals.

(4) Pittsburgh Penguins vs. (5) New York Islanders

The Pittsburgh Penguins entered the Quarterfinals as the fourth seed and they qualified for this round by defeating the St. Louis Blues in the preliminary round. The New York Islanders were seeded fifth in the Quarterfinals and qualified for this round by defeating the New York Rangers in the preliminary round. This was the first playoff series between these two teams. The teams split this year's regular season series. After trailing the series 3–0, the Islanders rallied to win four straight games and take the series. They became the second North American professional sports team (after the 1942 Toronto Maple Leafs) to accomplish such a feat.

Semifinals

(1) Philadelphia Flyers vs. (4) New York Islanders

This was the first playoff series between these two teams. The Flyers won this year's season series earning eight of twelve points during the regular season. After becoming the second North American professional sports team to win a best-of-seven series after trailing 3–0 in the previous round against the Penguins, the Islanders almost accomplished the same feat in this round. However, the Flyers firmly defeated them in game seven to preserve the series win. In doing so, the Islanders set a record for most consecutive playoff wins when facing elimination, 8. This would mark the last time an NHL team forced a seventh game of a best-of-seven series after trailing 3–0 until the Flyers themselves did so against Boston in the 2010 Eastern Conference Semifinals.

(2) Buffalo Sabres vs. (3) Montreal Canadiens

This was the second playoff series between these two teams, with Montreal winning the only previous meeting in six games in the 1973 Stanley Cup Quarterfinals. Buffalo won this year's season series earning nine of ten points during the regular season.

Stanley Cup Finals

The defending Stanley Cup champion Philadelphia Flyers' appeared in their second consecutive Stanley Cup Finals and second overall. In the previous year's Stanley Cup Finals, the Flyers defeated the Boston Bruins in six games. This was the Buffalo Sabres' first Stanley Cup Finals appearance in their fifth season. This was the first playoff series (and only Finals) meeting between these two teams. The Philadelphia Flyers won this year's regular season series earning seven of eight points.

In the first Stanley Cup Finals matchup between two expansion teams, The Philadelphia Flyers beat the Buffalo Sabres four games to two for their second consecutive Stanley Cup.

Awards

All-Star teams
Source: NHL.

Player statistics

Scoring leaders
Note: GP = Games played; G = Goals; A = Assists; Pts = Points

Source: NHL.

Leading goaltenders
Note: GP = Games played; Min = Minutes played; GA = Goals against; GAA = Goals against average; W = Wins; L = Losses; T = Ties; SO = Shutouts

Other statistics
 Plus-minus: Bobby Orr, Boston Bruins
 All Time NHL record for most Penalty Minutes in a season: 472, Dave Schultz, Philadelphia Flyers

Coaches

Patrick Division
Atlanta Flames: Bernie Geoffrion
New York Islanders: Al Arbour
New York Rangers: Emile Francis
Philadelphia Flyers: Fred Shero

Adams Division
Boston Bruins: Don Cherry
Buffalo Sabres: Floyd Smith
California Golden Seals: Marshall Johnston and Bill McCreary Sr.
Toronto Maple Leafs: Red Kelly

Norris Division
Detroit Red Wings: Alex Delvecchio
Los Angeles Kings: Bob Pulford
Montreal Canadiens: Scotty Bowman
Pittsburgh Penguins: Marc Boileau
Washington Capitals: Jim Anderson and Milt Schmidt

Smythe Division
Chicago Black Hawks: Billy Reay
Kansas City Scouts: Bep Guidolin
Minnesota North Stars: Jack Gordon and Charlie Burns
St. Louis Blues: Lou Angotti, Lynn Patrick and Garry Young
Vancouver Canucks: Phil Maloney

Debuts
The following is a list of players of note who played their first NHL game in 1974–75 (listed with their first team):
Guy Chouinard, Atlanta Flames
Danny Gare, Buffalo Sabres
Charlie Simmer, California Golden Seals
Wilf Paiement, Kansas City Scouts
Dave Hutchison, Los Angeles Kings
Clark Gillies, New York Islanders
Bob Bourne, New York Islanders
Rick Middleton, New York Rangers
Ron Greschner, New York Rangers
Bob MacMillan, New York Rangers
Pierre Larouche, Pittsburgh Penguins
Mario Tremblay, Montreal Canadiens
Tiger Williams, Toronto Maple Leafs
Harold Snepsts, Vancouver Canucks

Last games
The following is a list of players of note that played their last game in the NHL in 1974–75 (listed with their last team):
Murray Oliver, Minnesota North Stars
Henri Richard, Montreal Canadiens
Bobby Rousseau, New York Rangers
Ted Harris, Philadelphia Flyers
Eddie Shack, Toronto Maple Leafs
Norm Ullman, Toronto Maple Leafs
Doug Mohns, Washington Capitals

NOTE:  Ullman would finish his major professional career in the World Hockey Association.

See also 
 List of Stanley Cup champions
 1974 NHL amateur draft
 1974 NHL Expansion Draft
 1974–75 NHL transactions
 28th National Hockey League All-Star Game
 National Hockey League All-Star Game
 List of WHA seasons
 1974 in sports
 1975 in sports

References
 
 
 
 

Notes

External links
Hockey Database
NHL.com

 
1974–75 in Canadian ice hockey by league
1974–75 in American ice hockey by league